The 2021 Hampton Pirates football team represented the Hampton University as a member of the Big South Conference during the 2021 NCAA Division I FCS football season. Led by third-year head coach Robert Prunty, the Pirates played their home games at the Armstrong Stadium in Hampton, Virginia.

This was Hampton's final season as a member of the Big South Conference. The Pirates joined the Colonial Athletic Association (CAA) for all sports starting in 2022–23.

Previous season

The 2019 team finished with a record of 5–7, 1–5 in Big South play, finishing in a three-way tie for fifth place. The program did not compete in 2020 due to the COVID-19 pandemic.

Preseason

Big South poll
The Big South media days were held on July 27, 2021. In the conference preseason poll the Pirates were predicted to finish in seventh place.

Schedule

Game summaries

Virginia Union

Statistics

at Old Dominion

Statistics

at Howard

Statistics

Norfolk State

Statistics

No. 17 Kennesaw State

Statistics

at Charleston Southern

Statistics

North Carolina A&T

Statistics

at Robert Morris

Statistics

Gardner–Webb

Statistics

at Campbell

Statistics

North Alabama

Statistics

References

Hampton
Hampton Pirates football seasons
Hampton Pirates football